The prefix ped- (usually in the combining forms peda-, pedi-, and pedo-) in English and various other Western languages has multiple Latin and Ancient Greek roots, and multiple meanings.  Ped- (sometimes spelled paed-, pæd-, or rarely paid-, depending on the word and the language or dialect) is a prefix in English and many other Western languages, often with divergent spellings, such as pet-, pie-, pei-, etc.

Meanings
Ped- conveys multiple meanings, from different Latin and Ancient Greek root words:
 'Relating to feet', in words (e.g. pedestrian, pedicure) derived from Latin , genitive , 'foot', from the Proto-Indo-European stem *ped- with the same meaning.  Romance languages' words from this Latin root often take pie- spellings, as in medieval French and Italian  'foothill' (modern French , Occitan , Italian  or ), and Spanish  'foot, feet'. Many words in English and other Western languages relating to feet instead use the Greek-derived cognate pod- (e.g. podiatrist), and the Greek-derived suffix -pus may also be used (as in octopus).
 'Relating to children', from Greek , meaning 'child', which derived from the Proto-Indo-European stem *peu-, meaning 'small', 'young', or 'few'. It is usually spelled ped- in North American English (as in pediatrics and pedophilia), and pronounced  or  depending on the word. In Commonwealth English it is more often paed- (e.g. paediatrics, paedophilia), sometimes with a ligature as pæd-, and almost always pronounced .  Rarely in English, words from this root may take a paid- prefix (e.g. paidology), or take only a ped- not paed- spelling (pedagogy).
 'Relating to flatulence', from Latin  (infinitive , 'to fart'), the root for words relating to flatulation in several Indo-European languages;

In meanings 2, 3, and 4, the spelling remains ped- in Commonwealth English words that begin with these letters.  Not all derived words do; e.g., petard (a small bomb) is from meaning 4, and entered English from Middle French  for the same thing (originally literally meaning 'fart', it remains an uncommon Modern French word for 'firecracker').

Relating to children
Commonly in English, it is from the Greek , originally meaning 'boy'. as well as 'child'. Contemporarily, it is more associated with the word 'child'.  Words derived from this particular root are spelled paed- most cases in Commonwealth English varieties (formerly with a ligature, pæd-). 

Pederasty (paederasty), a relationship between an older man and an adolescent boy
Pediatrics (paediatrics), the branch of medicine devoted to the medical care of infants, children, and adolescents
Pedology (paedology, also rarely paidology), scientific study of children's behavior and development
Pedophilia (paedophilia), a paraphilia involving sexual attraction to pre-pubescent children
"Pedo" or "paedo", slang for "p[a]edophile"
Pedophile Group, a Danish organization active from 1985 to 2004
Pedobear, an Internet meme

Relating to feet
Meanings related to feet are from Latin  ('foot'):
Pedestal
Pedestrian
Pedicab
Pedicure
Pedometer
Pedal
Podiatrist
A Greek-derived equivalent, pod-, is often employed instead, as in "podiatry". The Greek-based -pus suffix conveys the same meaning, as in "octopus".

Relating to soil or plains
Ped- can also refer to soil. This prefix is from Greek  ('soil', 'the ground')
Ped, a unit of soil
Pedon, the smallest unit of soil that exemplifies its character
Pedalfer, a type of soil containing aluminum and iron oxides
Pedion, a single-faced crystal; also (capitalized) a brand name of tablet computer; both via analogy with a flat plain or field
Pedocal, a subdivision of the zonal soil order
Pedodiversity, variation in soil properties
Pedogenesis, the process by which soil is formed
Pedology, scientific study of soils
Pedometrics, the study of soil formation
Pedometric mapping, creation of maps based on soil properties
Pedosphere, the outermost layer of the Earth, composed of soil
Pedotope, total soil component of the abiotic matrix present in an ecotope
Pedotransfer function, predictive functions of certain soil properties from more easily measured properties

Relating to flatulence 
Another meaning, relating to flatulence, is from Latin  (infinitive , 'to fart'). It does not appear in English except in loan words but is the root for words referring to flatulation in several Western languages, often in modified form such as pet-
 Petard, an obsolete type of bomb used for breaching walls and gates
 Spanish  and many other words in Romance languages that more literally pertain to passing gas

Other uses 
It may also be used as an infix: such as with encyclopedia (encyclopaedia), and orthopedics (orthopaedics).

Some common English words with this derivation include:

Pedagogy, the study of teaching and approaches to it; the theory and practice of education.

References

Childhood
Words